The 2015 Monegasque municipal elections were held on 15 March to elect the 15 members of the Communal Council of Monaco.

Electoral system
Monegasque citizens over 18 are entitled to vote. The 15 councillors were elected for a four-year period in a single multi-member constituency using plurality-at-large voting with a two-round system. A majority of the votes was required to be elected. The second round would have been held one week after the first round.
The Mayor of Monaco was elected by the councillors after the election.
Candidates were required to be at least 21 years old and to have the Monegasque nationality for at least 5 years.

Results

Summary 

Georges Marsan was reelected mayor after the election.

Full results

References

External links
Complete election results
Election information

2015
2015 elections in Europe
Municipal election
March 2015 events in Europe